The Latin Grammy Award for Best Flamenco Album was an award presented by the Latin Grammy Awards for quality flamenco albums. According to the Latin Grammy Awards category description guide, the award was given, "For vocal or instrumental Flamenco albums containing at least 51% playing time of newly recorded material.  For Solo artists, duos or groups." Since the inception of the category, only Spanish performing artists have received the award.

Spanish musician Tomatito holds the record of most wins in the category with four, followed by Paco de Lucía with three wins. In 2014, Paco de Lucía won posthumously both this award and Album of the Year with his last album Canción Andaluza, becoming the first flamenco artist and album to do so.

Winners and nominees

2000s

2010s

2020s

See also
 Cante flamenco
 Flamenco guitar
 Palo (flamenco)

References

External links 
Official website of the Latin Grammy Awards

 
Awards established in 2000